"Bad Ass" is a song by American rapper Kid Ink with guest appearances from fellow rappers Meek Mill and Wale. The original version of the song appeared on Ink's 2012 mixtape Rocketshipshawty, and contained no verses from Meek Mill and Wale. The song was released on January 22, 2013 as the first single from his debut EP Almost Home (2013) and appear as a bonus track on the deluxe edition of his debut studio album My Own Lane (2014). It was co-written by all three artists and Devin Cruise, who also produced the song.  It peaked at number 90 on the Billboard Hot 100 and number 27 on the Hot R&B/Hip-Hop Songs chart.

Music video
The music video was directed by Alex Nazari and was released on March 4, 2013.

Remix 
On May 10, 2013, the official remix was released featuring west coast rappers YG and Problem. The remix also featured a reworked beat by KB and Mike Maven.

Track listing

Chart performance 
On the week of February 9, 2013, "Bad Ass" debuted at number 90 on the Billboard Hot 100, but left the next week. That same week, it debuted at number 27 on the Hot R&B/Hip-Hop Songs chart, but fell sixteen spots to number 43 for the week of February 16, before leaving the chart completely.

Release history

References 

2013 singles
2013 songs
Kid Ink songs
Meek Mill songs
Wale (rapper) songs
RCA Records singles
Songs written by Wale (rapper)
Songs written by Kid Ink
Songs written by Meek Mill